The Great Falls Balloon Festival is a hot air balloon festival held in the twin cities of Lewiston, Maine and Auburn, Maine. It has been held annually each August since 1993. The festival sitting on the banks of the Androscoggin River has attracted about 100,000 people, both locals and tourists annually. The festival takes place in several parks and plazas where the balloons lift off and feature  rides, games, music, and trade booths.

There was no festival in 2020.

See also
 Hot air balloon festivals

References

External links

Hot air balloon festivals in the United States
Festivals in Maine
Recurring events established in 1992
Tourist attractions in Androscoggin County, Maine
Culture of Lewiston, Maine
Auburn, Maine
Tourist attractions in Lewiston, Maine
1992 establishments in Maine